The Hour of 13 is a 1952 British historical mystery film directed by Harold French and starring Peter Lawford, Dawn Addams and Roland Culver. It was made at Elstree Studios by the British subsidiary of MGM. The film's sets were designed by the German-born art director Alfred Junge. Some location shooting took place around London including Kensington Gardens. The film is a remake of the 1934 thriller The Mystery of Mr. X.

Plot
Reminiscent of the Jack The Ripper school with a period setting in gaslit London, but this time the mysterious killer is The Terror who is murdering policemen. Lawford plays the handsome gentleman thief Nicholas Revel who gets himself involved in the murders, and the theft of a valuable emerald. The treatment is seldom serious yet is smartly resolved with a supporting cast of British stalwarts.

Cast
 Peter Lawford as Nicholas Revel
 Dawn Addams as Jane Frensham
 Roland Culver as Connor
 Derek Bond as Sir Christopher Lenhurst
 Leslie Dwyer as Ernie Perker
 Michael Hordern as Sir Herbert Frensham 
 Colin Gordon as MacStreet
 Heather Thatcher as Mrs. Chumley Orr
 Jack McNaughton as Ford
 Campbell Cotts as Mr. Chumley Orr
 Fabia Drake as Lady Elmbridge
 Michael Goodliffe as Anderson
 Moultrie Kelsall as Magistrate of Court
 Peter Copley as Cummings
 Richard Shaw as The 'Terror' 
 Sam Kydd as Reporter

Reception
According to MGM records the movie earned $344,000 in the US and Canada and $412,000 elsewhere, making a loss to the studio of $424,000.

See also
 The Mystery of Mr. X (1934)

References

External links
 
 The Hour of 13 at TCMDB
 
 

1952 films
Metro-Goldwyn-Mayer films
1950s English-language films
1950s mystery films
1950s historical films
British historical films
Films directed by Harold French
British mystery films
British remakes of American films
Films based on British novels
Films scored by John Addison
Films set in London
Films set in the 19th century
British black-and-white films
Films shot at MGM-British Studios
1950s British films